Mary Thomas may refer to:

 Mary Thomas (poet) (1787–1875), diarist, poet and early settler of South Australia

 Mary F. Thomas (1816–1888), American women's rights leader

 Mary Thomas (labor leader) (1848–1905), one of the leaders of the 1878 "Fireburn" labor riot on St. Croix, West Indies

 Mary Sternberg Thomas (1866–1951), lawyer in Colorado, U.S.
 Mary Beatrice Thomas (1873–1954), British lecturer in chemistry

 Mary Raine (1877–1960), Australian businesswoman and philanthropist, also known as Mary Thomas during her first marriage
 Mary Thomas (soprano) (1932–1997), Welsh soprano

 Mary Thomas (politician) (1944–2014), American Pima politician and activist
 Mary Thomas (artist) (born 1944), Aboriginal Australian artist at Warmun Art Centre, Turkey Creek, Western Australia